Adu is a surname. Notable people with the surname include:

 Albert Adu Boahen (1932–2006), Ghanaian academic, historian and politician
 Enoch Kofi Adu (born 1990), Ghanaian footballer
 Francis Adu Amanfoh (or Francis Amanfoh), Ghanaian general and diplomat
 Freddy Adu (born 1989), Ghanaian-born American soccer player
 Hans Adu Sarpei (or Hans Sarpei) (born 1976), Ghanaian-German footballer
 Jab Adu (1932–2016), Nigerian actor
 Kofi Adu (born 1969), Ghanaian actor and comedian
 Richard Adu-Bobie (born 1985), Canadian sprinter
 Sade Adu (born 1959), British musician
 Skelley Adu Tutu (born 1979), Ghanaian footballer
 Taner Adu (born 1984), English basketball player

Given name
 Adu Celso (1945–2005), Brazilian motorcycle road racer

Surnames of Akan origin